These are lists of the busiest airports in the United States, based on various ranking criteria.

Statistics

Busiest U.S. airports by total passenger boardings
The FAA uses passenger boarding for a full calendar year to determine Airport Improvement Program (AIP) entitlements. 
The term hub is used by the FAA to identify very busy commercial service airports. Large hubs are the airports that each account for at least one percent of total U.S. passenger enplanements. Medium hubs are defined as airports that each account for between 0.25 percent and 1 percent of the total passenger enplanements.

The 30 large hubs move 70% of the passengers with a traffic increasing by 2.5% from 2016 to 2017, while the 31 medium hubs grew by 5.2% and 16 airports lost airline services between 2014 and 2018, from 445 to 429.
Mainline carriers are up-gauging their fleet while scope clauses regional aircraft operations and turboprops and 50-seat regional jets are abandoned: aircraft with 50 seats or fewer represented 30% of domestic departures and 12% of seats offered in 2014, falling to 19% in 2018 and 7% of seats.
Accounting for 18% of passenger traffic, medium hubs stimulate point-to-point services like for Southwest Airlines, operating at 29, carrying most mainline passengers at 24 and more than half at 10.

Large hubs

Medium hubs

Busiest U.S. airports by total passenger traffic
List of busiest airports in the U.S. based on total passengers, data are based on numbers provided from annual or monthly published figures by own airport authorities.

2020

2019

2018

2016
Listed according to data compiled by Airports Council International North America, and ranked according to total passengers during 2016.

All 36 airports on this list are also featured on the FAA list, but the order varies. The FAA ranks by passengers boarding. ACI ranks by sum of boarding, disembarking, and flying through without leaving airplane. The statistics are slightly more than twice as high.

Busiest U.S. airports by international passenger traffic

Busiest U.S. airports by total cargo throughput

Listed according to data compiled by the Federal Aviation Administration for the United States and ranked according to total cargo throughput in pounds during 2017.

See also
List of airports in the United States
 List of the busiest airports in California
List of busiest airports by passenger traffic

References

External links
United States Department of Transportation:

Federal Aviation Administration (FAA): National Plan of Integrated Airport Systems (NPIAS) 2005-2009
FAA National Flight Data Center (NFDC): Airport Data (Form 5010), also available from AirportIQ 5010

Busiest
United States